Mervyn Dillon (born 5 June 1974), is a former West Indian cricketer who featured as a fast bowler. He emerged at the twilight of both Courtney Walsh and Curtly Ambrose's careers. Dillon soon became the Windies' new bowling spearhead, picking up a sum of 131 wickets in 38 test matches and 130 wickets from 108 one day internationals.

International career
Dillon was born in Mission Village, Toco, Trinidad and Tobago. At one stage, after Courtney Walsh and Curtly Ambrose retired from international cricket, Dillon was the spearhead of the West Indies bowling attack. Subsequently, Dillon was labelled by Simon Briggs as "the natural successor to Courtney Walsh", noting that " his action has a hint of [Walsh's] well-oiled efficiency". According to Briggs, "he takes a high percentage of wickets with the ball that angles in then just holds its own". Steve Waugh labelled him "the West Indies' most notable underachiever...when he had his act together, [he] didn't lose much in comparison to his legendary predecessors [Ambrose and Walsh]...such days were a rarity."

He was involved in a remarkable incident at Kandy's Asgiriya Stadium on 21 November 2001 in a test against Sri Lanka when he contracted abdominal pains and was replaced by Colin Stuart after two balls of his third over. Stuart was banned from bowling for the remainder of the innings by umpire John Hampshire after delivering two beamers that were called as no-balls in his first three deliveries. Chris Gayle then completed the last three balls of the over with his off-spin. This was the only instance in the history of Test cricket, when three bowlers were used to complete one over.

During the Windies' 2002 five test match series against India, one Dillon's bouncers went on to break the jaw of spinner Anil Kumble. He went on to pick up 23 wickets at an average of 27.21 in that said series.

In October 2007, Dillon signed up as an overseas player for the Indian Cricket League.

Coaching career
In January 2022 Dillon was appointed head coach of BPL outfit Sylhet Sunrisers.

References

1974 births
Living people
West Indies One Day International cricketers
Trinidad and Tobago cricketers
West Indies Test cricketers
Cricketers at the 1999 Cricket World Cup
Cricketers at the 2003 Cricket World Cup
Mumbai Champs cricketers